Vince Frost (born November 1964 in Brighton, England) is an interdisciplinary graphic designer who works across Advertising, Design, Digital, Environments and Fashion.

Early life
Vince Frost was born in Brighton, England, and raised in Vancouver, British Columbia, Canada. He returned to the United Kingdom at the age of sixteen, where he completed his design education at West Sussex College of Design.

Professional career
In 1989 he joined Pentagram on a full-time basis before becoming their youngest associate, just three years later, at the age of 27.

In November 1994 he formed his own consultancy, Frost Design in London, creating work for clients from The Independent newspaper to Nike.

In 2003 Vince relocated to Sydney, Australia, from where he now runs an internationally focused creative ideas studio of 40 people, Frost*collective.

As well as holding membership to various design societies globally, Frost is an executive committee member of D&AD (Design and Art Directors, London). He has won awards from the New York Society of Publication Designers, D&AD, the Art Directors Club of New York and Tokyo, among many others.

In November 2014 Frost released his second publication, Design Your Life. The book features 15 principles he created for personal improvement. It also contains an account of Frost's upbringing, including his struggle with a hyperactive growth hormone disorder in his adolescence that saw him battling to walk.

References 

English graphic designers
People from Brighton
1964 births
Living people